Juan Carlos "Pichino" Carone (born May 18, 1942) is a former Argentine footballer. He played as a right-footed left winger.

Carone is most notable for his period in Vélez Sársfield (1964–1969), where he scored 76 goals in 149 games in the Argentine Primera División, being the 6th overall top scorer in the club's history.

Carone is nicknamed "Pichino", that means "Kid" in Italian.

Club career
Carone played youth football in River Plate and Atlanta, and debuted in the Argentine Primera División with the latter on August 5, 1962, in a 0–2 defeat to Gimnasia y Esgrima La Plata.

In 1963, Vélez Sársfield paid eleven million Argentine pesos (6 in cash plus the loan of two players) to buy him. With Vélez, he was the top goalscorer of the Argentine Primera División in the 1965 championship (with 19 goals), and was part of the league title winning team in the 1968 Nacional, though he played rarely in the latter due to an Achilles tendon injury.

In 1970, the winger moved to Racing Club, where he played for half-a-year. He then retired playing in Mexico with CD Veracruz.

International career
Carone played for the Argentina national team in the 1966 FIFA World Cup qualification, but was not part of the final World Cup squad. He also played in the 1967 South American Championship.

Honours
Vélez Sársfield
Argentine Primera División (1): 1968 Nacional

References

External links

Living people
1942 births
Footballers from Buenos Aires
Argentine footballers
Argentine expatriate footballers
Argentina international footballers
Argentine Primera División players
Club Atlético Atlanta footballers
Club Atlético Vélez Sarsfield footballers
Racing Club de Avellaneda footballers
C.D. Veracruz footballers
Expatriate footballers in Mexico
1967 South American Championship players
Association football wingers